Pete, Pearl & the Pole (lit. "A clean sweep"), also known as 1931: Once Upon a Time in New York, is a 1973 Italian-American gangster film directed by Luigi Vanzi (credited as Vance Lewis) and starring Tony Anthony.

Cast
 Tony Anthony as Pete Di Benedetto
 Adolfo Celi as The Pole
 Lucretia Love as Pearl
 Richard Conte as Bruno
 Corrado Gaipa as Mob Boss
 Irene Papas as Donna Mimma
 Lionel Stander as Sparks
 Raf Baldassarre as Raf, Pole's Henchman

Production
The film was shot mainly on location with predominantly American funding.

The film originated as a story written by actor Tony Anthony, with whom director Luigi Vanzi had previously shot The Stranger series of Spaghetti Westerns (A Stranger in Town, The Stranger Returns, and The Silent Stranger). This was Vanzi's last film.

Release
The film was released on March 3, 1973. It was distributed by P.A.C. in Italy.

References

Footnotes

Sources

External links

1972 films
1970s crime films
Italian crime films
1970s Italian-language films
Films set in the United States
Films set in 1931
1970s English-language films
American gangster films
American action drama films
1970s American films
1970s Italian films